The Westcliff School, at 304 4th St. in Westcliffe, Colorado, was built in 1891.  It was listed on the National Register of Historic Places in 1989.

It has also been known as the Old Westcliffe School House.  It was built of local field stone by stonemason, Archie Scherer, and is notable for his workmanship in the quoins and placement of dark field stones amongst the lighter ones.

The listing included three contributing buildings.

It was named as consistent with the standards for historic listing set by a 1999 study, "Rural School Buildings in Colorado MPS", but had already been listed.

References

Schools in Colorado
National Register of Historic Places in Custer County, Colorado
Buildings and structures completed in 1891